Raja Paarvai is an Indian Tamil television series on Star Vijay. It  premiered on 22 March 2021. It is a remake of Star Jalsha's Bengali series Sanjher Baati starring Munaf Rahman and Rashmi Jayaraj.

Plot 
It is the story of a visually impaired man after an accident whose life begins to have a positive change after a girl's entry in his life.

Cast

Main 
 Munaf "Munna" Rahman as Anand: Aravind brother, Charu's love interest & husband, Mahalakshmi and Viswanathan's Son
 Rashmi Jayaraj as Charu: Chandran's daughter, Pavithra's half Sister, Anand's love interest & wife

Recurring 
 Vikash Sampath as Aravind: Amirtha former love interest, Anand younger brother, Mahalakshmi and Viswanathan Son, Pavithra husband
 Keerthi Vijay as Pavithra, Chandran and Kokila daughter, Charu half younger Sister, Aravind wife
 Anandhi Ajay as Vanmathi (Main Antagonist)
 Yalini Rajan as Amirtha, Aravind former love interest
 Aarthi Ramkumar as Mahalakshmi, Anand, Aravind & Aarthi's mother, Viswanathan Wife, Visalatchi Sister in law, Sadhana Enemy 
 Bhagyalakshmi 
 Sivan Sreenvisan as Viswanathan, Anand and Aravind father, Mahalakshmi husband 
 Girish as Chandran, Kokila 2nd husband, Charu and Pavithra father 
 Shiva Kavitha as Kokila, Chandran 2nd Wife, Pavithra mother: Charu adopted mother 
 Mahesh as Balaji, Kokila younger brother, Chandran brother in law 
 Revathee Shankar as Meenatchi and Viswanathan mother 
 Revathy Priya as Vishalstchi, Mahalakshmi Sister in law, Rahul's mother
 Hari Krishnan  
 SK Karthick as Maaran 
 Sharnita Ravi as Aarthi 
 Master Deepesh as Rahul   
 VJ Darsu Riey as Vandhana: Sadhana daughter, Anand Enemy 
 Deepa Nethran
 Kirubaa as Sadhana, Mahalakshmi Enemy 
 Sudha
 Vignesh as Vaasu
krishnakumar as Ranga

Adaptations

References

External links 

 

Star Vijay original programming
2021 Tamil-language television series debuts
2021 Tamil-language television series endings
Tamil-language television shows
Tamil-language television series based on Bengali-languages television series